Li Zhen (December 1914 – October 1973) was a general and politician of the People's Republic of China.

Li Zhen was born in Gaocheng, Hebei in 1914. He joined the Communist Party of China in 1937. He was awarded the rank of major general, in 1955. He was appointed Minister of Public Security in 1972, but committed suicide in 1973.

1914 births
1973 deaths
People's Republic of China politicians from Hebei
Politicians from Shijiazhuang
People's Liberation Army generals from Hebei
Chinese Communist Party politicians from Hebei
Suicides in the People's Republic of China
Ministers of Public Security of the People's Republic of China